Albert Hanlin "Al" Crews Jr. (born March 23, 1929), (Col, USAF, Ret.), is a former American chemical and aeronautical engineer, and U.S. Air Force astronaut.

Early life and education
He was born on March 23, 1929, in El Dorado, Arkansas. He graduated in 1950 from the University of Louisiana at Lafayette (then named Southwestern Louisiana Institute) with a Bachelor of Science degree in chemical engineering. He earned a Master of Science degree in aeronautical engineering from the U.S. Air Force Institute of Technology in 1959.

Test pilot

As a USAF Test Pilot School graduate, he was selected as a military astronaut designee in the second group of X-20 Dyna-Soar astronauts on April 20, 1962, and assigned as a Dyna-Soar pilot on September 20, 1962. The Dyna-Soar program was cancelled in 1963. On November 12, 1965, he was selected as an astronaut in the first group for the Manned Orbiting Laboratory (MOL) program. He transferred to NASA Flight Crew Directorate at the Johnson Space Center, Houston, Texas, in June 1969 when the MOL program was cancelled. He remained a pilot for NASA, flying such aircraft as the "Super Guppy" outsize cargo transport, the WB-57F atmospheric research aircraft and the OV-095 SAIL Space Shuttle simulator until he retired at age 65.

Personal life
He is married, with three children from his previous marriage: Gail, Marina and Kellee.

References

External links

Astronautix biography of Albert H. Crews Jr.
Spacefacts biography of Albert H. Crews Jr.
Lost space dreams: How Al Crews missed out on becoming an astronaut - twice

1929 births
Living people
People from El Dorado, Arkansas
Military personnel from Arkansas
NASA people
American astronauts
Aviators from Arkansas
American chemical engineers
American aerospace engineers
University of Louisiana at Lafayette alumni
United States Air Force officers
Air Force Institute of Technology alumni
U.S. Air Force Test Pilot School alumni
American test pilots